(aka Seven Mysteries) is a 1957 black-and-white, full screen Japanese film directed by Goro Katono. It is Japanese horror film (J-Horror) based on the story  by Akira Sugawa. It was never dubbed in English, nor shown in the United States. The Japanese title translates as Ghost Story of the Seven Wonders of Honjo.

Cast 
 Juzaburo Akechi
 Shigeru Amachi
 Hiroshi Hayashi
 Uraji Matsuura
 Akiko Tamashita
 Michiko Tachibana

See also 
 Seven Wonders of Honjo (本所七不思議)

References

External links 
 
The Seven Wonders of Honjo at hyakumonogatari.com

Japanese horror films
Japanese black-and-white films
1957 films
1957 horror films
1950s ghost films
Shintoho films
1950s Japanese films